Muktar Edris (born 14 January 1994) is an Ethiopian professional long-distance runner who competes in track and cross country races.

Career
Muktar made his first international appearances in 2011, taking seventh place in the junior race at the 2011 IAAF World Cross Country Championships (sharing the team silver medal) and finishing fourth in the 10,000 metres at the 2011 African Junior Athletics Championships with a time of 28:44.95 minutes.

He began to raise his profile in 2012 with two prominent wins on the junior stage. First he defeated Kenyan opposition to win at the 2012 African Cross Country Championships, and then he went on to take the 5000 metres gold medal at the 2012 World Junior Championships in Athletics. He performed well in the 5000 m that year, taking the Ethiopian national title (in the absence of many established runners). He won over the distance at the Meeting Lille Métropole and competed on the Diamond League for the first time, setting a best of 13:04.34 minutes at the Meeting Areva in Paris. He had podium finishes on the Italian road circuit towards the end of the year, coming third at the Giro di Castelbuono and close to victory at the BOClassic, where he recorded the same time as winner Imane Merga.

He performed well in cross country at the start of 2013, winning the Campaccio, Cross della Vallagarina and Cinque Mulini races. He followed this up with a bronze in the 2013 IAAF World Cross Country Championships in the junior race behind compatriot Hagos Gebrhiwet. In his first road outing of the year he won the Giro Media Blenio race.

In Stockholm, 21 August 2014 he recorded the fastest time in the world so far that year with 12:54.83.

On 12 August 2017, he won the 5000 metres at the World Championships in Athletics 2017 London beating Mo Farah in his last track race at the world championships. The Gold medal was the second for Ethiopia in London 2017 enhancing its world ranking to number 4 on the day. 

On 30 September 2019, he won the 2019 World Athletics Championships in Doha on the 5000m race at a time of 12:58.85.

Personal bests
3000 metres: 7:30.96 minutes (2021)
5000 metres: 12:54.83 minutes (2014)
10,000 metres: 27:17.18 minutes (2015)
10 km road: 27:57 minutes (2019)

Major competitions

References

External links

Living people
1994 births
Ethiopian male long-distance runners
World Athletics Championships athletes for Ethiopia
Athletes (track and field) at the 2016 Summer Olympics
Olympic athletes of Ethiopia
World Athletics Championships medalists
World Athletics Championships winners
21st-century Ethiopian people